Serge Marquand was a French actor and film producer (12 March 1930 – 4 September 2004). He died of advanced leukemia.

He was the brother of Nadine Trintignant and Christian Marquand.

Filmography 

1959: Les Liaisons dangereuses (by Roger Vadim) - Un skieur (uncredited)
1960: Et mourir de plaisir (by Roger Vadim) - Giuseppe
1961: Pleins feux sur l'assassin (by Georges Franju) - Yvan
1961: La Bride sur le cou (by Roger Vadim) - Prince
1961: Les Trois Mousquetaires (in two parts, Les Ferrets de la reine and La Revanche de Milady) (by Bernard Borderie)
1961: Tintin and the Golden Fleece (by Jean-Jacques Vierne) - Le Facteur
1961: Les Parisiennes (sketch "Ella", by Jacques Poitrenaud) - Chauffeur de taxi (segment "Ella")
1961: Ca c'est la vie (by Claude Choublier) - Le jeune employé
1963: Les Bricoleurs (by Jean Girault) - Le chasseur du professeur
1963: Le Vice et la vertu (by Roger Vadim) - Ivan
1963: L'Abominable homme des douanes (by Marc Allégret) - Arnakos' lawyer
1963: Les Grands chemins (by Christian Marquand) - Mechanic
1963: Méfiez-vous, mesdames (Un monsieur bien sous tous rapports) (by André Hunebelle) - Paulo
1964: La Mort d'un tueur (by Robert Hossein)
1964: La Ronde (by Roger Vadim)
1964: Massacre at Marble City (by Paul Martin) - Fielding
1964: Angélique marquise des anges (by Bernard Borderie) - Jactance
1965: Black Eagle of Santa Fe (Die schwarzen Adler von Santa Fe) (by Ernst Hofbauer and Alberto Cardone) - Blacky James
1965: Marvelous Angelique (by Bernard Borderie) - Jactance
1965: Compartiment tueurs (by Costa-Gavras) - Un amant de Georgette (uncredited)
1965: Le Chant du monde (by Marcel Camus) - Le neveu
1965: Le Reflux (by Paul Gégauff) (not on general release)
1966: 3 cavaliers pour Fort Yuma (Per pochi dollari encora) (by Giorgio Ferroni) - Stagecoach Passenger (uncredited)
1967: Le Recherché (Wanted) (by Giorgio Ferroni) - Frank Lloyd
1968: Trahison à Stockholm (Rapporto Fuller, base Stoccolma) (by Sergio Grieco) - Bonjasky
1968: Histoires extraordinaires (sketch "Metzengerstein", by Roger Vadim) - Hugues (segment "Metzengerstein")
1968: Negresco (by ) - Borell
1968: Barbarella (by Roger Vadim) - Captain Sun
1968: The Cats (I bastardi) (by Duccio Tessari) - Jimmy
1969: Cemetery Without Crosses (by Robert Hossein) - Larry Rogers
1969: Le Voleur de crimes (by Nadine Trintignant) - Guieff, l'ami de Christian
1969: La Maison de campagne (by Jean Girault) - Le taupier
1969: Gli specialisti (by Sergio Corbucci) - Boot
1970: Dernier domicile connu (by José Giovanni) - Le gueulard (uncredited)
1971: Les Stances a Sophie (by Moshé Mizrahi) - Jean-Pierre
1971: Ca n'arrive qu'aux autres (by Nadine Trintignant) - The Brother
1972: What a flash (by Jean-Michel Barjol)
1973: Les Gants blancs du diable (by Laszlo Szabo) - Serge
1973: Défense de savoir (by Nadine Trintignant)
1973: The Train (by Pierre Granier-Deferre) - Moustachu
1974: Le Passager (Caravan to Vaccares) (by Geoffrey Reeve)
1975: Le Jeu avec le feu (by Alain Robbe-Grillet) - Mathias
1975: Rosebud (by Otto Preminger) - Antoine Marachini
1975: Section spéciale (by Costa-Gavras) - André Obrecht, le premier adjoint de l'Exécuteur
1975: Il pleut sur Santiago (by Helvio Soto) - Général Lee
1975: Les Lolos de Lola (by Bernard Dubois) - Le chauffeur
1975: Attention les yeux ! (by Gérard Pirès) - Mercenary
1975: Police Python 357 (by Alain Corneau) - Le rouquin
1975: Le Voyage de noces (by Nadine Trintignant) - Nico
1976: Une femme fidèle (by Roger Vadim) - Samson
1978: Les Raisins de la Mort (by Jean Rollin) - Lucien
1978: Le Maître nageur (by Jean-Louis Trintignant, + producer) - Alfredo
1978: ville à prendre (by Patrick Brunie) - Dan Quichotte à Beaubourg
1979: The Big Red One (The Big Red One) (by Samuel Fuller) - Rensonnet
1980: Une femme au bout de la nuit (by Daniel Treda) - L'amant
1981: Quartet (Quartet) (by James Ivory) - Night Club Owner
1982: Boulevard des assassins (by Boramy Tioulong) - Raoul Taffa
1983: Les Îles (by Iradj Azimi) - Designy
1983: Premiers désirs (by David Hamilton) - Pierre-Albert
1984: Frankenstein 90 (by Alain Jessua) - Commissioner
1985: L'Été prochain (by Nadine Trintignant) - Le professeur à l'hôpital
1985: Adieu blaireau (by Bob Decout) - Le patron du 'Carré d'As'
1986: Chère canaille (by Stéphane Kurc, cut from final version) - Lino
1987: Grand guignol (by Jean Marboeuf) - Le client
1988: La Maison de Jade (by Nadine Trintignant) - L'empaillé
1989: Antonin (by Yves Caumon, short) - Nestor
1992: Krapatchouk (by Enrique Gabriel) - Philemon

 Television
1967: Le Golem (by Jean Kerchbron)
1988: Anges et loups - Gondo
1998: Le Comte de Monte-Cristo (by Josée Dayan) - Pair St Gyon

 Assistant director
1959: Les Liaisons dangereuses (by Roger Vadim)
1972: Une journée bien remplie (by Jean-Louis Trintignant)

 Producer
1979: Le Soleil en face (by Pierre Kast)

Theatre 
 1963 : Six Hommes en question by Frédéric Dard & Robert Hossein, directed by Robert Hossein, Théâtre Antoine

External links 
 
 Photo on DVDtoile
 Find "Le Golem" on Les grandes fictions de la télévision on Ina.fr

1930 births
2004 deaths
Male actors from Paris
French male film actors
French male stage actors
French male television actors
French people of Arab descent
French people of Spanish descent